The table below lists the judgments of the Constitutional Court of South Africa delivered in 2012.

The members of the court at the start of 2012 were Chief Justice Mogoeng Mogoeng, Deputy Chief Justice Dikgang Moseneke, and judges Edwin Cameron, Johan Froneman, Chris Jafta, Sisi Khampepe, Bess Nkabinde, Thembile Skweyiya, Johann van der Westhuizen and Zak Yacoob. The seat left empty by the retirement of Sandile Ngcobo in August 2011 was filled by the appointment of Raymond Zondo in September 2012.

References

 

2012
Constitutional Court
Constitutional Court of South Africa